Mwinga Mwanjala (born 13 January 1960) is a Tanzanian middle-distance runner. She competed in the women's 800 metres at the 1980 Summer Olympics. She was the first woman to represent Tanzania at the Olympics.

References

1960 births
Living people
Athletes (track and field) at the 1974 British Commonwealth Games
Athletes (track and field) at the 1978 Commonwealth Games
Athletes (track and field) at the 1980 Summer Olympics
Athletes (track and field) at the 1984 Summer Olympics
Tanzanian female middle-distance runners
Olympic athletes of Tanzania
Commonwealth Games competitors for Tanzania
Place of birth missing (living people)